Romanzo criminale – La serie (meaning "Criminal Novel – The Series") is an Italian television series based on the novel of the same name by the judge Giancarlo De Cataldo. The series is an adaptation of the film Romanzo Criminale (2005) directed by Michele Placido. The first series quickly achieved cult status in Italy.

This is the second fiction series after Quo Vadis, Baby? that was produced by Sky and broadcast on Fox Crime, Sky One and on Sky Arts with English subtitles in 2012.

The series is partially based on  Banda della Magliana, a 1970s criminal organization  active in Rome led by three friends, Libanese, Freddo and Dandi, who attempted to merge local gangs in a mafia feud like sicilian and neapolitan organisations. Their history matched with right-wing terrorism groups, deviated secret service, masonic lodges and financial affairs.

See also
List of Italian television series

Footnotes

External links
 

Italian crime television series
2008 Italian television series debuts
2010 Italian television series endings
Television series about organized crime
2000s Italian television series
2010s Italian television series
Biographical films about Italian bandits
Works about organized crime in Italy